Rutland Nunatak is a cone-shaped nunatak with associated rock outcrops, 2070 m, in the west part of Chapman Snowfield, Churchill Mountains. The nunatak is 10 nautical miles (18 km) east-northeast of Wilhoite Nunataks. Named by Advisory Committee on Antarctic Names (US-ACAN) after cartographer Jane Rutland Brown, Antarctic map compilation specialist in the United States Geological Survey (USGS) Branch of Special Maps, 1951–71.
 

Nunataks of Oates Land